The 2015–16 Top League Challenge Series was the 2015–16 edition of the Top League Challenge Series, a second-tier rugby union competition in Japan, in which teams from regionalised leagues competed for promotion to the Top League for the 2016–17 season. The competition was contested from 13 December 2015 to 24 January 2016.

There was no automatic promotion to the 2016–17 Top League, but Kyuden Voltex, Mitsubishi Sagamihara DynaBoars, Munakata Sanix Blues and Osaka Police progressed to the promotion play-offs.

Competition rules and information

The top two teams from the regional Top East League, Top West League and Top Kyūshū League qualified to the Top League Challenge Series. The regional league winners participated in Challenge 1, while the runners-up participated in Challenge 2. The winner of Challenge 2 also progressed to a four-team Challenge 1.

All four teams in Challenge 1 qualified to the promotion play-offs.

Qualification

The teams qualified to the Challenge 1 and Challenge 2 series through the 2015 regional leagues.

Top West League

The final standings for the 2015 Top West League were:

 Chubu Electric Power, JR West Railers, Osaka Police and Unitika Phoenix qualified to the Second Phase.
 Mitsubishi Red Evolutions were relegated to lower leagues.

 Osaka Police qualified for Challenge 1.
 Chubu Electric Power qualified for Challenge 2.

Top East League

The final standings for the 2015 Top East League were:

 Mitsubishi Sagamihara DynaBoars qualified for Challenge 1.
 Kamaishi Seawaves qualified for Challenge 2.

Top Kyūshū League

The final standings for the 2015 Top Kyūshū League were:

 Chugoku Electric Power, Kyuden Voltex, Mazda Blue Zoomers and Munakata Sanix Blues qualified to the Second Phase.

 Munakata Sanix Blues qualified for Challenge 1.
 Kyuden Voltex qualified for Challenge 2.

Challenge 1

Standings

The final standings for the 2015–16 Top League Challenge 1 were:

 Kyuden Voltex, Mitsubishi Sagamihara DynaBoars, Munakata Sanix Blues and Osaka Police progressed to the promotion play-offs.

Matches

The following matches were played in the 2015–16 Top League Challenge 1:

Challenge 2

Standings

The final standings for the 2015–16 Top League Challenge 2 were:

 Kyuden Voltex progressed to Challenge 1.

Matches

The following matches were played in the 2015–16 Top League Challenge 2:

See also

 2015–16 Top League
 Top League Challenge Series

References

2015-16 Challenge
2015–16 in Japanese rugby union
2015–16 rugby union tournaments for clubs